William John "Wild Bill" Hapac (January 26, 1918 – March 9, 1967) was the first consensus All-American to play for the University of Illinois men's basketball team when he garnered the recognition during his senior season of 1939–40. A native of Chicago, Illinois, Hapac was an all-state player for J. Sterling Morton High School East in 1935.

Hapac would star for the Fighting Illini before playing in the National Basketball League from 1940 to 1948. He set a then-unheard of Big Ten Conference single game scoring record of 34 points against Minnesota on February 10, 1940. His senior year, he was honored as a Consensus NCAA First Team All-American and was the first ever recipient of the University of Illinois' Athlete of the Year award. In addition to basketball, Hapac also lettered for three years while playing for the school's baseball team.

Hapac played professionally for the Chicago Bruins for the 1940–41 season, followed by four years of military service. He returned to the NBL in 1945, playing for the Chicago American Gears for the 1945–46 season, the Anderson Packers for the 1946–47 season and the Oshkosh All-Stars for the 1947–48 season. Hapac finished his professional career by playing for an independent league team, the Chicago Ingots, for the 1947–48 season.

Military and beyond
Hapac was pursued by the Detroit Tigers, but while waiting for spring training to begin, he was inducted into the US Army, eventually earning him the rank of captain. Hapac coached basketball with fellow Illini player, Jim Vopicka, at Morton East from 1952 until his death in 1967 at 49 years of age of an undisclosed rare disease. Shortly after his death, the newly constructed gymnasium at Morton East was dedicated to his memory.

Honors

 1940 – Consensus All-American
 1940 – First-team All-Big Ten
 1940 – University of Illinois Athlete of the Year
 1973 – Inducted into the Illinois Basketball Coaches Association's Hall of Fame as a player.
 September 13, 2008 – Honored as one of the thirty-three honored jerseys which hang in the State Farm Center to show regard for being the most decorated basketball players in the University of Illinois' history.

Statistics

College

NBL

Regular season

Playoffs

References

External links

 
 NBL stats

1918 births
1967 deaths
All-American college men's basketball players
American men's basketball players
Anderson Packers players
Basketball players from Chicago
Chicago American Gears players
Chicago Bruins players
Forwards (basketball)
Illinois Fighting Illini baseball players
Illinois Fighting Illini men's basketball players
Oshkosh All-Stars players
Baseball players from Chicago